Rhodeus haradai is a subtropical freshwater fish belonging to the Acheilognathinae subfamily of the family Cyprinidae.  It originates in the Hainan province of China. When spawning, the females deposit their eggs inside bivalves, where they hatch and the young remain until they can swim.

Named in honor of I. Harada, ichthyologist who reported this new species as R. spinalis in 1943.

References 

Fish described in 1990
haradai